Betty Taylor (October 7, 1919 – June 4, 2011) was an American actress and performer, best known as "Slue Foot Sue" in Disneyland's Golden Horseshoe Revue, opposite Wally Boag.

Taylor died on June 4, 2011, at the age of 91, the day after Boag died.  Her interment was in Seattle's Evergreen Washelli Memorial Park.

References

External links 

Hear Betty Taylor perform on a 1949 government-sponsored radio program "The Jerry Gray Show"

1919 births
2011 deaths
American entertainers
Place of birth missing
Place of death missing